Phetetso Monese (born September 22, 1984 in Maputsoe, Lesotho) is a cross-country mountain biker who placed 21st at the 2014 Commonwealth Games in Glasgow.  He currently races on the Ace - The Sufferfest - Lesotho MTB Team
and is the highest ranked black African rider on the UCI rankings. Phetetso Monese is also part of the first Basotho team to feature as part of the podium of the UCI Lesotho Sky stage race coming 2nd overall  and winning day 4 of the event. Monese has qualified for the 2016 Summer Olympics, becoming the first Olympic cyclist from Lesotho.

References

External links
 Official Website
 Feature article about Phetetso Monese in cyclingtips.com website

1984 births
Living people
Lesotho male cyclists
Cross-country mountain bikers
Cyclists at the 2014 Commonwealth Games
Cyclists at the 2018 Commonwealth Games
Commonwealth Games competitors for Lesotho
People from Leribe District
Cyclists at the 2016 Summer Olympics
Olympic cyclists of Lesotho